Salisbury High School is a public, co-educational secondary school located in Salisbury, North Carolina. It is one of seven high schools in the Rowan–Salisbury School System.

History
Salisbury High School began in 1904 and was among the earliest public high schools in North Carolina. The current location was completed in 1926 and named Boyden High School in honor of Colonel Archibald Henderson Boyden, an educator who was then Mayor of Salisbury. It is one of many schools built across North Carolina in the early 20th century. The building was designed by C. Gadsen Sayre and built by L. S. Bradshaw, and (as Boyden High School) was added to the National Register of Historic Places on May 23, 1996. Six additional buildings were constructed on campus to facilitate the school's expanding offerings and enrollment, many of them as part of the Works Progress Administration. In 1971, during desegregation, Boyden and J.C. Price high schools consolidated to form Salisbury High School.

School information
For the 2009–2010 school year, Salisbury High School had a total population of 938 students and 67.82 teachers on a (FTE) basis.

As of the 2009–2010 school year, out of the student total, the gender ratio was 50.32% male to 49.68% female. The demographic group makeup of the student population was: Black, 54.05%; White, 32.84%; Hispanic, 11.19%; Asian/Pacific Islander, 1.92%; and American Indian, 0%. For the same school year, 62.15% of the students received free and reduced-cost lunches.

Graduations are generally held at Catawba College's Keppel Auditorium.

Academics
In 2008, Salisbury High School was ranked a Silver Level school by U.S. News & World Report and was also included in the magazine list of top 1000 public schools in the nation. In 2011, for the fifth consecutive year, Salisbury High was listed as one of U.S. News & World Report's Best High Schools.

Salisbury High has nearly 180 students taking Advanced Placement courses, the most of any school in the district. The school offers 16 AP courses during the 2011–2012 school year. Salisbury High also has the highest average SAT score in the school system, with a score of 1480.

The high school was rated a School of Distinction for the 2009–10 school year on the North Carolina State Board of Education's yearly School Report Cards.

Athletics
Salisbury High School is classified as a 2A school and competes in the Central Carolina Conference.

The men's soccer team won the North Carolina 2A State Championship in 2011, defeating Carrboro High School 3–2 in sudden death overtime. The soccer team was 24–1–1 overall for the season.

The school received the 2010 NCHSAA Exemplary School Award.

Administration
Marvin Moore serves as principal beginning in June, 2020, taking over from Luke Brown. Moore was previously principal at Isenberg Elementary School in Salisbury.

Notable alumni
 Keion Adams (born 1995), NFL linebacker
 Bill Baker (1911–2006), former MLB player
 Elizabeth Dole (born 1936), United States Senator 2003–2009
 Bobby Jackson (born 1973), former NBA player, coach of the Stockton Kings
 Romar Morris (born 1992), running back in the Canadian Football League
 Bobby Phillips (born 1975), former professional basketball player in Belgium and Austria

References

External links
 
 Rowan-Salisbury School System site

Public high schools in North Carolina
Educational institutions established in 1926
Salisbury, North Carolina
Schools in Rowan County, North Carolina
Works Progress Administration in North Carolina
School buildings on the National Register of Historic Places in North Carolina
National Register of Historic Places in Rowan County, North Carolina
1926 establishments in North Carolina